Askham Richard is a village and civil parish in the unitary authority of City of York in the north of England,  south-west of York, close to Copmanthorpe, Bilbrough and Askham Bryan. The population of the civil parish at the 2011 census was 351. The village became a Conservation Area in 1975. Nearby is Askham Bryan College of Agriculture.

The village was historically part of the West Riding of Yorkshire until 1974. It was then a part of the district of Selby District in North Yorkshire from 1974 until 1996. Since 1996 it has been part of the City of York unitary authority.

History
The village is mentioned in the Domesday Book. The name comes from ascam or ascha meaning "enclosure of ash-tree". It has been also known as "Little" or "West" Askham". The "Richard" in the village name is reputed to be that of Richard, 1st Earl of Cornwall.

The villages of Askham Richard and close-by Askham Bryan were once just one manor around the time of Edward the Confessor and belonged to Edwin, Earl of Mercia. When Edwin's lands were confiscated by the William the Conqueror, the village was granted to Roger de Mowbray who then passed the Manor to his friend, William de Tykhill, a former Warden of Foss Bridge.

Governance
Askham Bryan lies in the Rural West York Ward of the City of York Unitary Authority. As of the 2019 elections it is represented by Councillors James Barker and Anne Hook who are both members of the local Liberal Democrats. It is a part of the UK Parliamentary Constituency of York Outer. Until January 2020 it also fell within the boundaries of the Yorkshire and the Humber European Parliament constituency.

Demography
In 1848, parish records show the population as 232. In 1881, the National Census showed the population as 226. According to the 2001 census the parish had a population of 273. The 2011 census recorded the population as 351.

Geography
The village consists of one main street, where the main village green and duck pond are located, and a couple of small lanes. The soil consists of gravel and clay.

The village is 1.7 miles west of Askham Bryan, 2.3 miles south of Rufforth, 1.5 miles north-east of Bilbrough.

Economy
Within the village is Her Majesty's Prison Askham Grange. Also in the village is the Rose and Crown pub. There are three farms, but the remainder are dwellings. The nearby Askham Bryan College of Agriculture and Horticulture provides some local employment.

Transport
York Pullman serves the village 2/3 times a day (Monday-Saturday) in each direction on service 37 which runs between Tadcaster to York.

Education
Primary education is catered for at St. Mary Church of England primary school. Nearby is Askham Bryan College of Agriculture and Horticulture. The college was originally known as the Yorkshire Institute of Agriculture, which opened in 1948. It became Askham Bryan College of Agriculture and Horticulture 19 years later. It now includes equine management, animal management, land management, business, food production, engineering and bioscience.

Religious sites
The Norman-styled St Mary's Church was partly rebuilt in 1887. The church is Grade II* listed, and there is record of a church as far back as 1086.

Notable people 

Mary Flora Bell lived and worked here for a while. She also spent some time at the HM Prison Askham Grange.

Gallery

References

External links

 

Villages in the City of York
Civil parishes in North Yorkshire